Equilibrium is the sixth studio album by American sludge metal band Crowbar, released in March 2000. It was original bassist Todd Strange's final album with the band until his 2016 return.

Track listing

Personnel
Kirk Windstein – vocals, rhythm guitar
Sammy Pierre Duet – lead guitar
Todd Strange – bass
Sid Montz – drums

Music videos
"I Feel the Burning Sun"

References

2000 albums
Crowbar (American band) albums